The White amplifier was an instrument amplifier made by the Fender company, named for Fender's production manager Forrest White and designed as a surprise by Leo Fender for his longtime associate. It was sold together with the matching steel guitar and was made from 1954 until 1962. Approximately 1,500 copies were made. The amp was nearly identical to the 5F2 Princeton circuit, but was made under the White production name, probably "to get more inexpensive amps and steels into the market without offending authorized Fender dealers." The amplifier was not in fact white, but had blue-gray linen tweed, dark blue grill cloth, and blue dyed leather handles.

See also
 Fender Princeton

References

Fender amplifiers